Shahnaamah-i-Chitral is a lengthy epic poem written by Chitrali poet Baba Siyar in the 19th century.  The lengthy Persian narrative deals with some serious subject and contains details of heroic deeds and events of cultural and national significance.

See also
Tarikh-i-Chitral
Nayi Tarikh-i-Chitral

References

Manuscripts
Unpublished books
Epic poems in Persian
19th-century books
History of Chitral